List of Chief Executives of New Zealand Railways

They were titled General Manager unless otherwise specified.

J. P. Maxwell				1880-89
J. McKerrow      1889-94 
(Chief Comissioner)
T. Ronayne				1895-1913
E. H. Hiley 				1913-19
R. W. McVilly				1919-24 
F. J. Jones 				1924-28
(Chairman, Government Railways Board) 	
H. H. Sterling				1928-31 
Col. J. J. Essen			1931
(Temporary Chairman, Government Railways Board)
H. H. Sterling				1931-36
(Chairman, Government Railways Board) 
P. G. Rousssel 			1931-32 
G. H. Mackley				1933-40 
E. Casey 				1940-44
J. Sawyers				1944-48 
F. W. Aickin				1948-51
H. C. Lusty				1951-55 
W. E. Hodges				1953-57 
(Chairman, NZR Commission) 
A. T. Gandell 				1955-66 
I. Thomas 				1966-72
A. F. Small				1972-76 
T. M. Hayward			1976-83
H. G. Purdy 				1983-87
K. O. Hyde 				1987-

References  
 

New Zealand people in rail transport
Rail